Removal may refer to:

 Removal (band)
 Removal jurisdiction in the United States courts
 Deportation, the legal removal by a government of a foreign citizen from its territory
 Removal of a child from its parents and placement in foster care by a child protection agency

Removal may also indirectly refer to:
 Administrative removal in immigration law
 Amputation, removal of a body extremity by trauma or surgery 
 Deforestation (forest/tree removal)
 Enucleation of the Eye (eye removal)
 Hair removal
 Hedgerow removal
 Hidden line removal, computer graphics
 Indian removal, the early 19th century United States domestic policy
 Manual placenta removal
 Removal Services for moving house
 Removal of Internet Explorer
 Rib removal
 Penectomy (penis removal); see also emasculation
 Snow removal
 Stock removal
 Under cover removal
 Wire removal

See also
 Relocation (disambiguation)
 Removable (disambiguation)
 Remove (disambiguation)